Elias Mariolopoulos (1900–1991) was a Greek meteorologist. Born in Athens, he graduated from the School of Physics and Mathematics, University of Athens; MA, University of Cambridge; Diploma in Meteorology Imperial College of Science and Technology, London, and PhD, Docteur de l’ Université de Paris, Sciences; Docteur es Sciences Physiques, Paris, 1925. He has closely collaborated with Sir Napier Shaw, then head of the British Meteorological Office and President of the International Meteorological Committee, which has been predecessor of the World Meteorological Organization.

In 1926, he was appointed as Head of the Meteorological Department of the National Observatory, Athens. In 1928, he was elected Professor of Meteorology and Climatology at the Department of Physics and Mathematics, Aristotle University of Thessaloniki, Greece. In 1935 he was appointed as Director of the National Observatory, Athens. In 1939 he was invited as honorary Professor to the Chair of Meteorology at the University of Athens. At the same time he takes over the management of the Meteorological Institute of the National Observatory, Athens. 
When World War II was declared, Professor Mariolopoulos has served as a major in the Greek Air Force, assuming command of an echelon of officer-meteorologists at the Air Force headquarters. At the National Observatory, Athens, Mariolopoulos was particularly active and, for the first time in Greece, he established a service for the measurement of Atmospheric Electricity, set up a special Radiometric Station on Mt. Hymettus, as an annex of the National Observatory, Athens while at the University of Athens he supervised dozens of doctoral dissertations.

Elias Mariolopoulos’ administrative work is great. He was twice elected Dean of the School of Physics and Mathematics at the Aristotle University of Thessaloniki, twice Dean of the School of Physics and Mathematics at the University of Athens and Rector of the University of Athens during the Academic year 1959-60.

His research work consisting of more than a hundred scientific publications has been acknowledged by foreign colleagues. He was elected Vice President of the International Climatologic Committee from 1931 until World War II. He was also elected a member of the International Committee of Upper Atmosphere as well as of the International Committee of Agricultural Meteorology. As recognition and reward for his work, the Academy of Athens elected him as a member in 1965 and later as President of the Academy in 1973.

Elias Mariolopoulos was one of the pioneering scientists of his discipline, who brought up in their early papers the upcoming deterioration of the atmosphere caused by human activities. He was the first to initiate in Greece, since the 1960s, measurements of air pollutants at the Institute of Meteorology of the National Observatory, Athens and the Laboratory of Meteorology, University of Athens. After his retirement from the University of Athens, the Academy of Athens has accepted his proposal to establish the Research Center of Atmospheric Physics and Climatology (which was set up in 1977).

The French Academy of Sciences, considering his work, awarded him in 1966. The Royal Meteorological Society of England elected him as Fellow. He was also an honorary member of the Serbian Geographical Society and the Hungarian Meteorological Society.

For his scientific and social achievements, Mariolopoulos received many honorary distinctions, notable of which are: The Egyptian Medal of Senior Commander of the Arabic Order of Merit (1960), The French Medal Officier de la Legion d’ Honneur (1960), Senior Commander of the Royal Order of the Phoenix (1959), Commander of the Royal Order of King George I (1953), Saint Mark’s War Medal (1948), Campaign Medal 1940/41 (1948), Gold Cross of the Phoenix With Swords (1946), The French Medal Officier de l’ Academie (1938), Commander of the Royal Order of the Phoenix (1936), Senior Commander of the Holy Sepulchre (1930).

Finally, Mariolopoulos has served for many years as: President on the Board of the National Observatory of Athens, Member of the European Coudenhove-Kalergi Foundation in Switzerland, President of the Geodetic and Geophysics Commission of the State, President of the National Commission of Radio Electricity, Vice President of the Supreme Telecommunications Council, President Emeritus of the Greek Meteorological Society and President of the Union of Greek Physicists, President of the Othon and Athena Stathatou’s Award, Member of the board of directors of the Empirikion Foundation, President of the Greek Panarcadian Federation and others.

In 1938 he gets married with Ekaterini-Nina, daughter to Peter Kanaginis, Director of Settlement of the Ministry of Agriculture, and later General Director of the Ministry of Agriculture. She has provided the funds to establish the "Mariolopoulos-Kanaginis Foundation for the Environmental Sciences" to honor the memory of her husband Elias Mariolopoulos and his teaching and service of the ideals of WMO. The Foundation has established the "WMO Professor Mariolopoulos Trust Fund Award" a biennial award for research work established since 1996.

References 

 Mariolopoulos-Kanaginis Foundation for the Environmental Sciences

1900 births
1991 deaths
Greek meteorologists
Rectors of the National and Kapodistrian University of Athens
Academic staff of the National and Kapodistrian University of Athens
People from Athens